Viscount Palmerston was a title in the Peerage of Ireland. It was created on 12 March 1723 for Henry Temple, who subsequently represented East Grinstead, Bossiney and Weobley in the British House of Commons. He was made Baron Temple, of Mount Temple in the County of Sligo, at the same time, also in the Peerage of Ireland. He was succeeded by his grandson, the 2nd Viscount, who represented seven constituencies in the House of Commons and served as a Lord of the Admiralty and Lord of the Treasury. On his death the titles passed to his son, the 3rd Viscount, who became a distinguished politician and served three times as Foreign Secretary and twice as Prime Minister of the United Kingdom. At his death in 1865 the 3rd Viscount was granted a state funeral, the fourth non-royal to be given this honour. Lord Palmerston was childless and the barony and viscountcy became extinct on his death.

The Temple family descended from Peter Temple, of Dorset and Marston Boteler. His eldest son John Temple acquired the Stowe estate in Buckinghamshire and founded the English branch of the family from whom the Viscounts Cobham, the Dukes of Buckingham and Chandos and the Earls Temple of Stowe are descended. Peter Temple's younger son Anthony Temple was the founder of the Irish branch of the family from whom the Viscounts Palmerston descended. His son Sir William Temple (1555–1627) was secretary to Sir Philip Sidney and the Earl of Essex and afterwards provost of Trinity College Dublin. Sir William's son, Sir John Temple (1600–1677), was Master of the Rolls in Ireland. The latter was the father of Sir William Temple, a diplomat, and Sir John Temple (1632–1704), Speaker of the Irish House of Commons and father of the first Viscount Palmerston.

The third Viscount Palmerston married the Honourable Emily Lamb, sister of Prime Minister Lord Melbourne and widow of Peter Clavering-Cowper, 5th Earl Cowper. Emily's second son from her first marriage, the Honourable William Cowper, inherited parts of his stepfather's estates, including Broadlands near Romsey in Hampshire, and assumed the additional surname of Temple. In 1880 he was raised to the peerage as Baron Mount Temple, a revival of the junior title held by the Viscounts Palmerston. He was childless and the peerage became extinct on his death in 1888. However, it was revived once again in 1932 in favour of his great-nephew, Wilfrid Ashley. He had no sons however and the title became extinct again upon his death in 1938. His daughter, the Honourable Edwina, wife of Lord Louis Mountbatten, inherited Broadlands.

Viscounts Palmerston (1723)
Henry Temple, 1st Viscount Palmerston (–1757)
Henry Temple, 2nd Viscount Palmerston (1739–1802)
Henry John Temple, 3rd Viscount Palmerston (1784–1865)

Arms

See also
Viscount Cobham
Duke of Buckingham and Chandos
Earl Temple of Stowe

References

Noble titles created in 1723
1723 establishments in Ireland
1865 disestablishments in Ireland
Extinct viscountcies in the Peerage of Ireland